Crystal Waters (also known as Crystal Waters Permaculture Village and Crystal Waters Ecovillage) is an 85 Lot Body Corporate housing development situated in Conondale in the Sunshine Coast hinterland of Queensland, Australia.

In 1996, the village of Crystal Waters was a finalist in the World Habitat Awards by the Building and Social Housing Foundation for its "pioneering work in demonstrating new ways of low impact, sustainable living". In 1998, the village of Crystal Waters was included in the "World's Best Practices" database of the United Nations organization.

References

Conondale, Queensland
Housing estates in Australia
Sustainable communities
Sustainable architecture